The Church of Nuestra Señora de las Nieves (Spanish: Iglesia Parroquial de Nuestra Señora de las Nieves) is a church located in Cenizate, Spain. It was declared Bien de Interés Cultural in 1991.

References 

Nuestra Senora de las Nieves (Cenizate)
Bien de Interés Cultural landmarks in the Province of Albacete